Fernando Vicente Fibla (born 8 March 1977) is a professional tennis coach and a former player from Spain, who turned professional in 1996. He reached his career-high ATP ranking of world No. 29 in June 2000, winning three singles titles and reaching the quarterfinals of the 1998 Rome Masters and the 2000 Cincinnati Masters.

He is  the coach of Andrey Rublev since 2017, having previously coached Marcel Granollers and Marc López from 2010 to 2014.

Career finals

Singles: 6 (3–3)

Doubles: 6 (2–4)

Notes

References

External links
 
 
 Vicente World Ranking History

1977 births
Living people
People from Baix Maestrat
Spanish expatriate sportspeople in Andorra
Spanish male tennis players
Sportspeople from the Province of Castellón
Tennis players at the 2000 Summer Olympics
Tennis players from the Valencian Community
Spanish tennis coaches
Mediterranean Games bronze medalists for Spain
Mediterranean Games medalists in tennis
Competitors at the 1997 Mediterranean Games
Olympic tennis players of Spain